Condemned to Death is a 1932 British crime film directed by Walter Forde and starring Arthur Wontner, Gillian Lind and Gordon Harker. It was adapted from the play Jack O'Lantern by James Dawson which was itself based on a 1929 novel by George Goodchild.

Thought to have been lost, "a cut version dubbed in French" was found as a result of a 1992 British Film Institute campaign to locate missing movies.

Plot
A respected judge leads a double life as a murderer.

Cast
 Arthur Wontner as Sir Charles Wallington 
 Gillian Lind as Kate Banting 
 Gordon Harker as Sam Knudge 
 Cyril Raymond as Jim Wrench 
 Jane Welsh as Sonia Wallington 
 Norah Howard as Gwen Banting 
 Edmund Gwenn as Banting 
 Griffith Humphreys as Professor Michaels 
 T. Gordon Blythe as Ali 
 James Cunningham as Inspector Sweeting 
 Gilbert Davis as Doctor Cornell 
 Bernard Brunel as Tobias Lantern 
 H. St. Barbe West as Sir Rudolph Cantler

References

External links

1932 films
1932 crime films
British films based on plays
Films based on British novels
Films directed by Walter Forde
Films shot at Twickenham Film Studios
Films based on multiple works
1930s rediscovered films
British black-and-white films
British crime films
Rediscovered British films
Films set in London
1930s English-language films
1930s British films